This is a list of notable restaurants in Hawaii.

Restaurants in Hawaii

  
    
 Halekulani (hotel) – has three restaurants

See also

 Cuisine of Hawaii
 List of Hawaiian dishes
 Lists of restaurants

References

External links
 

Hawaii

restaurants